Heather Rankin is the name of:

 Heather Rankin (singer) (born 1967), Canadian singer and actor
 Heather Rankin (curler) (born 1965), Canadian curler